"Break the Night with Colour" is a song by English singer-songwriter Richard Ashcroft, included as the third track on his third studio album, Keys to the World (2006). It was released as the first single from that album on 9 January 2006, peaking at number three on the UK Singles Chart. It also found success in several other countries, reaching number three in Italy, number 10 in Ireland, and number 17 in Austria.

Track listings
UK CD single and limited-edition 7-inch vinyl 
 "Break the Night with Colour"
 "The Direction"

UK DVD single 
 "Break the Night with Colour"
 "Slip Sliding"
 "Break the Night with Colour" (video)
 "Break the Night with Colour" (making of the video)

Charts

Weekly charts

Year-end charts

References

2006 singles
2006 songs
Parlophone singles
Richard Ashcroft songs
Song recordings produced by Chris Potter (record producer)
Songs written by Richard Ashcroft